Omphalophora is a genus of snipe flies of the family Rhagionidae. They are delicate to fairly robust flies, from 3 to 10 mm. they are entirely black or brown in colour.

Species
Omphalophora arctica (Frey, 1918)
Omphalophora cinereofasciata (Schilling, 1838)
Omphalophora fasciata (Loew, 1870)
Omphalophora lapponica Frey, 1911
Omphalophora majuscula (Loew, 1870)
Omphalophora nigripilosa (Hardy & McGuire, 1947)
Omphalophora oculata Becker, 1900

References

Rhagionidae
Brachycera genera
Diptera of Europe
Diptera of North America
Taxa named by Theodor Becker